Brachyrhizomys is an extinct genus of ground-dwelling herbivorous rodent that lived in Miocene to Pleistocene of China and India.

Species
Brachyrhizomys blacki
Brachyrhizomys choristos
Brachyrhizomys hehoensis
Brachyrhizomys micrurus
Brachyrhizomys nagrii
Brachyrhizomys naquensis
Brachyrhizomys pilgrimi
Brachyrhizomys pinjoricus
Brachyrhizomys shansius
Brachyrhizomys tetracharax

External links
Brachyrhizomys tetracharax at Paleozoological Museum of China official website (Chinese)
Brachyrhizomys at fossilworks

Miocene rodents
Pliocene rodents
Pleistocene rodents
Pleistocene mammals of Asia
Spalacidae